John W. Henson is a Democratic former member of the New Hampshire House of Representatives, representing the Rockingham 13th District since 2006.

External links
New Hampshire House of Representatives - John Henson official NH House website
Project Vote Smart - Representative John W. Henson (NH) profile
Follow the Money - John Henson
2006 campaign contributions

Members of the New Hampshire House of Representatives
Living people
Year of birth missing (living people)